Surat Thani International Airport   is an international airport located in Phunphin District, Surat Thani Province, in Southern Thailand. The airport, 21 kilometres west of Surat Thani City, also is home to the Royal Thai Air Force (RTAF) squadrons. Surat Thani International Airport has a single paved runway. It is the tenth-busiest airport in Thailand in terms of passengers, handling more than two million passengers annually.

Airlines and destinations

Terminated

Thai Airways Company - Bangkok–Don Mueang 
Thai Airways International - Bangkok–Don Mueang, Bangkok–Suvarnabhumi
Thai Lion Air - Chiang Mai, Hat Yai

Statistics

Passengers

History

Donnok airport  
Surat Thani Airport's predecessor is known locally as Donnok Airport. It is located around 3 kilometres away from Surat Thani City, and has a single, gravel paved runway, 800 meters in length. Later, the runway was expanded by the Royal Thai Air Force and became 1,000 metres long. The  runway is only capable of handling small planes, such as DC-3.

The current airport 
Due to the original airport's close proximity to Surat Thani, The Civil Aviation Authority of Thailand (CAAT) planned a new airport away from the city. A former airfield used in The Second World War by the military was chosen as the site for the new airport. After the construction site was chosen, a plan for the airfield's development was proposed. However, in 1973, the government suspended the development project and used the funds to support Phuket International Airport's operations instead.

In 1975, many residents in Surat Thani called for the project's reconsideration. The Ministry of Defence and CAAT showed interest in the project and the airfield's development began in 1978. The airport was officially opened on 15 April 1981. It had a single runway, 2,500 metres in length. In 1993, the runway was expanded to support larger commercial flights and military operations.

Future upgrades and developments 

The Department of Airports announced a 1.7 billion Baht plan to upgrade the airport. Details of the project are as following:

 The airport's apron will be expanded to increase its capacity up to 11 Boeing 737s at a time.
 The electrical system and wires will be moved underground.
 The airport terminal will be expanded to accommodate up to 3.6 million passengers a year. The car park will also be expanded to handle up to 700 cars at a time.
 The runway will be upgraded to increase its strength.
 Construction of the new transportation center to handle more passengers.

Military use

As well as being a commercial facility, Surat Thani Airport is an active RTAF base, the home of 4th Air Division/7th Wing Air Combat Command. 701 Squadron, "Shark", flies twelve SAAB JAS-39 C/D Gripen fighter aircraft. 702 Squadron operates two airborne early warning (AEW) and two transport SAAB SF340 airplanes. A further two SF340s are on order.

Accidents and incidents

References

External links

Surat Thani Airport at Thaiflyingclub.com – includes pictures
Technical details on Surat Thani Airport
Aviation Savety Network on the 1988 crash
Surat Thai Airport Statistics (Thai)
Surat Thani Airport History (Thai)

Airports in Thailand
Buildings and structures in Surat Thani province
Airports established in 1981